Murray Gordon Watts (born 31 March 1955) is a former New Zealand rugby union player. He was a member of the New Zealand national side, the All Blacks, between 1979 and 1980, appearing in 13 matches including five internationals. In all he scored seven tries for the All Blacks.

References

1955 births
Living people
People from Patea
People educated at Stratford High School, New Zealand
New Zealand rugby union players
New Zealand international rugby union players
Manawatu rugby union players
Taranaki rugby union players
Rugby union wings
Rugby union players from Taranaki